The president of Somaliland is the head of state and head of government of Somaliland. The president is also commander-in-chief of the Somaliland Armed Forces. The president represents the Government of Somaliland. 

The first president of Somaliland was Abdirahman Ahmed Ali Tuur. The current office-holder is the 5th president Muse Bihi Abdi, who took office on 13 December 2017. The President can serve a maximum of two five-year terms. 
The Republic of Somaliland regards itself as the successor state to the former British Somaliland Protectorate, which was an independent country for a few days in 1960 as the State of Somaliland.

History

The first president of Somaliland was Abdirahman Ahmed Ali Tuur, one of the leaders of the Somali National Movement (SNM), who took office on 7 June 1991, weeks after Somaliland was declared a republic. Since then the office has been held by four further people: Muhammad Haji Ibrahim Egal, Dahir Riyale Kahin, Ahmed Mohamed Mohamoud, and Muse Bihi Abdi.

Eligibility

By Article 82 of the Constitution of Somaliland, a person shall be eligible for the office of President or Vice President if (a) he is a citizen of Somaliland by birth, and, notwithstanding residence as a refugee in another country, must not hold any other citizenship; (b) he must be a Muslim, and must behave in accordance with  Islamic religion; (c) he must be at least 40 years of age; and (d) he fulfills other criteria set out in this Article.

List of presidents of Somaliland

Death in office
One Somaliland president has died in office:
 Muhammad Haji Ibrahim Egal, who died on 3 May 2002 aged 73.

Latest election

See also
 Somaliland
 Politics of Somaliland
 Vice President of Somaliland
 Lists of office-holders

References

External links
 Constitution in English

 
Government of Somaliland